The Digambara Jain Temple, Rourkela, Sundergarh district, India, is a Jain temple or mandir.

Jain temples in Odisha
Rourkela